Set Piece is an original novel written by Kate Orman and based on the long-running British science fiction television series Doctor Who. It features the Seventh Doctor, Ace, Bernice and Kadiatu Lethbridge-Stewart. It is the last New Adventure to feature Ace as a regular character, although she appeared sporadically throughout the rest of the series. A prelude to the novel, also penned by Orman, appeared in Doctor Who Magazine #222.

Plot

Ms Cohen is travelling on a starliner that falls through a time rift and is boarded by giant mechanical ants. She wakes up on board a vessel known as The Ship, where the ants and human prisoners they use as slaves are slowly processing the captured humans and storing their minds inside Ship's systems. The human guards, however, have a problem. One prisoner, whom they call the "Gingerbread Man", repeatedly escapes from cold storage despite their best efforts. Ms Cohen witnesses several of these escapes and watches the guards brutally beat him to the point where he seems to be suffering a heart attack. As Ms. Cohen tries to start him breathing again, she realises he has two hearts. Eventually she realises that the "Gingerbread Man's" escapes always go to a different part of Ship, therefore he is looking for someone. In his next escape, he reaches the freezers, where Ace is trapped.  The Doctor is finally able to summon Bernice to rescue them. But the attempt fails and the Doctor, Ace and Bernice are thrown out into the rift. Ms Cohen is trapped on Ship and eventually processed like the others.

Some months earlier, the Doctor shows Bernice and Ace a mysterious cafe that manifests itself at different locations in time and space, ranging from Glebe, New South Wales to Argolis. The Doctor says this as a result of a Time Rift, which has punched through the fabric of reality. An unknown force is using the rift to snare passenger ships. The Doctor and Ace plan to get captured and learn what is happening having failed, the three travellers are separated.

Ace falls out of the rift in the Egyptian desert during the Akhenaten period, where she is found by nobleman Sedjet and becomes part of his household body guard.  Because she is a woman, she has to constantly prove herself. The only person who seems to accept her is the priest, Sesehaten. Although she can still hear Egyptian as English, she eventually accepts that the Doctor will not be coming to rescue her. When Sedjet tries to take her on as his mistress, Ace realises that he will only ever see her as a curiosity. She leaves his house, abandoning the force field generator she used to travel through the rift. Unable to find work as a soldier, she is reduced to working as a waitress. She encounters Sesehaten again, who tells her that odd lights have been seen in the sky. Ace realises that the rift may be opening and rushes back to Sedjet's house. The building is empty and the ants are there looking for the force field generator. Sesehaten reveals that he is part of the cult of Set (also known as Sutekh), which has been outlawed since Pharaoh forced Egypt to accept a single religion and one god Aten. Sesehaten's cult will help Ace leave through the rift, if she helps them kidnap the Pharaoh. Ace agrees, as she sees Akhenaten as another in the long line of fascists she has fought. Ace breaks into Akhenaten's palace and takes him hostage, but Ace realises through talking to him that he is no better or worse than any other ruler. In the courtyard he reveals the TARDIS, which his army recovered when it fell from the sky, explaining how Ace could understand Egyptian. Using the instruments, Ace discovers that Sesehaten is not human, but a machine built by Ship to control the rift.

Bernice lands in France in 1798 and makes friends with Vivant Denon, a founder of modern Egyptology and one of her heroes. Together they travel to Egypt with Napoleon's army and Bernice attempts to find the Amarna Graffito, a mysterious phrase written on a tomb wall in modern English, which she has a strange feeling can help her find the TARDIS. Searching inside a tomb, she is trapped by survivors of Set's cult, who steal her diary thinking it and the message are key to releasing their god from his prison. Denon rescues her and together they lead French troops to the Cultists camp, where Benny recovers her diary and finds the location of the graffiti.

The Doctor, suffering from post-traumatic stress disorder, appears in 1871 Paris, as the events of the Paris Commune unfold. He finds himself in the care of Kadiatu Lethbridge-Stewart, whose time travel experiments created the rift. Now they are both trapped in Paris. The ants have followed them and Kadiatu takes the Doctor to M. Thierry's house for shelter. Despite his confused state of mind, the Doctor still realises that Thierry's young son is not all he seems and suspects Thierry is really in league with the ants. Thierry and Kadiatu have been helping the Doctor recover, playing for time and hoping that he will reveal to them the information that Ship couldn't take from his mind.

Ace has the TARDIS buried in the monument at Amarna and writes a message on the wall, so the Doctor or Bernice will eventually find it. She then uses Sesehaten to open the rift and with the help of the force shield, escapes through it. In 1798, Bernice does indeed find the TARDIS and after saying goodbye to Denon, she too leaves for the Doctor's location. In Paris, Thierry uses the ants' technology with Kadiatu's time machine to stabilise the rift, but unfortunately the Doctor has filled it with explosives, hoping the ants would take it back to Ship. The resulting explosion kills Thierry and tears the rift completely open. A little boy appears and attempts to stabilise the rift as first Ace, then the TARDIS come through. He is a machine built to stabilise the rift like Sesehaten. As the rift widens, Ace shoots the boy, sealing the rift in the process.

The Doctor, his mind recovering, explains to Ace and Benny that Ship is an organic computer, built by a human colony to store their minds in a gestalt entity, but having fallen through Kadiatu's rifts, it is now trying to store all organic matter in the universe and has built the ship and the ants to fulfil its purpose. The travellers return to Paris and Ace watches the chaos around her. Knowing that the Commune will fail and thousands will be killed, she tries to persuade the woman fighters that their attack are pointless, just as Akhenaten's religious reforms were ultimately undone and forgotten. But the fighters believe that fighting for their beliefs is more important than winning.

Bernice finds Kadiatu is giving Ship dead bodies killed in the Commune to process into organic machinery for time travel. Ship has also infected Kadiatu with an organic virus that is slowly taking her over. She has been playing for time hoping to come up with a virus to kill Ship. Ship overcomes her virus and she becomes a part of Ship and goes back for the Doctor, whom his companions now realise has also been infected, which will allow Ship to read his mind and use the knowledge to open more rifts and process more minds.

Refusing to let the Doctor be sacrificed Ace uses one of Kadiatu’s organic time hoppers to follow them to Ship, where she tries to track down the Doctor. All the prisoners and the human guards have been processed and the three people are the only ones aboard. Kadiatu shoots Ace, but she is only badly wounded. The Doctor is connected to the fabric of Ship, but the moment he accesses Ship’s central nervous system, he is able to shut it down directly. As Ship dies, Kadiatu leaps into the rift and disappears. Ace gets the Doctor back to Paris, where he allows himself to die temporarily, thus killing the organic material which Ship had implanted in him.

As the TARDIS is about to leave Ace chooses to stay. She knows she can't change history, but actions maybe able to save some lives. She also plans to use the surviving technology to monitor the rifts and protect Earth from any other threats like Ship. The Doctor reveals that he has known where she would end up since soon after he met her. The Epilogue shows Ace, now using the name Dorothee McShane, meeting Denon and telling him that Bernice is safe. She again meets the Doctor in Sydney, 1993 and helps him fight an alien invasion. In the present of 1871, Ace helps defend a barricade until the last moment, then puts down her gun and disappears into history.

External links
 Set Piece Prelude
 The Cloister Library - Set Piece

1995 British novels
1995 science fiction novels
British science fiction novels
Novels by Kate Orman
Virgin New Adventures
Seventh Doctor novels
Fiction set in 1798
Fiction set in 1815
Fiction set in 1871
Fiction set in 1995